Upshot-Knothole Dixie was the fourth test-firing of Operation Upshot–Knothole, an atomic weapons test series conducted in 1953 by the United States at the Nevada Test Site.

Upshot-Knothole Dixie was an 11-kiloton airdrop shot which detonated at 6,000 feet altitude, the highest air burst detonation conducted to that date.

Explosions in 1953
Nevada Test Site nuclear explosive tests
1953 in Nevada
1953 in military history
April 1953 events in the United States